Acianthus pusillus, commonly known as small mosquito orchid, is a species of flowering plant in the orchid family Orchidaceae and is endemic to eastern Australia. It is a terrestrial herb with a single, heart-shaped leaf and up to 18 small, translucent green or pinkish flowers with reddish marking and a green to reddish-purple labellum. It is widely distributed, growing in moist places from central-eastern Queensland, south through New South Wales and Victoria to South Australia and Tasmania.

Description
Acianthus pusillus is a terrestrial, perennial, deciduous, sympodial herb with a single heart-shaped, glabrous, dark green leaf which is reddish-purple on its lower surface.

The thick, fleshy callus covers most of the upper surface of the labellum and sometimes has many small pimple-like papillae on the outer half.

This species is distinguished from the similar A. exsertus by its usually smaller leaf, smaller flowers and much smaller labellum.

Taxonomy and naming
Acianthus pusillus was first formally described by David Jones in 1991 and the description was published in Australian Orchid Research. The specific epithet (pusillus) is a Latin word meaning "very small" in reference to the small flowers and small stature of this species.

Distribution and habitat
This orchid is widespread and locally common in a range of habitats from rainforest margins to heathland on inland hills. In Queensland, it occurs in the Port Curtis and Moreton botanical districts; in New South Wales on the North Coast, Central Coast and South Coast, Northern, Central and Southern Tablelands; in southern parts of Victoria; in the Flinders Ranges, Eyre Peninsula, Northern and Southern Mount Lofty, Murray, Yorke Peninsula, Kangaroo Island and South-Eastern Botanical Regions of South Australia and in Tasmania. It sometimes forms colonies of thousands of plants, the leaves often carpeting the ground.

Conservation
Acianthus pusillus is not threatened in New South Wales.

References

External links 
 

pusillus
Orchids of New South Wales
Orchids of Queensland
Orchids of Victoria (Australia)
Orchids of South Australia
Orchids of Tasmania
Endemic orchids of Australia
Plants described in 1991
Taxa named by David L. Jones (botanist)